Vasectomy: A Delicate Matter is a 1986 film directed by Robert Burge and starring Paul Sorvino, Cassandra Edwards, Abe Vigoda, Ina Balin, and Lorne Greene.

Premise
After his wife gives birth to their eighth child, a bank executive reluctantly consents to undergo vasectomy.

References

External links

1980s English-language films
American comedy films
Sterilization (medicine)
Contraception for males
Male genital surgery
1986 films
1986 comedy films
Films scored by Fred Karlin
Films shot in Texas
Vasectomy
1980s American films